Novogeorgiyevka is a rural locality (a selo) and the administrative center of Novogeorgiyevsky Selsoviet of Shimanovsky District, Amur Oblast, Russia. The population was 435 as of 2018. There are 10 streets.

Geography 
Novogeorgiyevka is located on the Bereya River, 46 km southwest of Shimanovsk (the district's administrative centre) by road. Svobodny Trud and Saskal are the nearest rural localities.

References 

Rural localities in Shimanovsky District